MLBP may refer to:
 The record label owned by Mitch Laddie
 Modified local binary patterns